Honami Tsukiji (築地 保奈美 Tsukiji Honami, born April 27, 1989) is a Japanese volleyball player who played for Toray Arrows.

Profiles 
While attending Kyushubunka Gakuen high school, the volleyball team won the top of Japanese high school with Yukari Miyata and Saki Minemura.
In June 2011, she retired and became the team staff.

Clubs 
 Kyushubunka high school
 Toray Arrows (2008-2011)

Awards

Team 
2008 Domestic Sports Festival (Volleyball) -  Runner-Up, with Toray Arrows.
2008-2009 V.Premier League -  Champion, with Toray Arrows.
2009 Kurowashiki All Japan Volleyball Championship -  Champion, with Toray Arrows.
2009-2010 V.Premier League -  Champion, with Toray Arrows.
2010 Kurowashiki All Japan Volleyball Championship -  Champion, with Toray Arrows.
2010-11 V.Premier League -  Runner-up, with Toray Arrows.

References

External links
Toray Arrows Women's Volleyball Team

1989 births
Living people
Sportspeople from Fukuoka (city)
Japanese women's volleyball players
21st-century Japanese women